General elections were held in Niger on 12 December 1989 to elect a President and National Assembly. They were the first elections since 1970, and followed the approval of a new constitution in a referendum in September, which had made the country a one-party state with the National Movement for the Development of Society as the sole legal party. As a result, its leader, the incumbent president Ali Saibou, was elected unopposed, and the party won all 93 seats in the Assembly. Voter turnout was 95.1%.

Results
For the first time, women won seats in the National Assembly, with Roukayatou Abdou Issaka, Bibata Adamou Dakaou, Souna Hadizatou Diallo, Aïssata Karidjo Mounkaïla and Marie Lebihan becoming the country's first female members of parliament.

References

Niger
General election
Elections in Niger
One-party elections
Single-candidate elections
Presidential elections in Niger
Nigerien general election